Ole Smoky Tennessee Moonshine is a corn whiskey distillery in Gatlinburg, Tennessee. Their downtown Gatlinburg, Tennessee facility features two working copper stills. Visitors are able to see the distilling process up close while learning about the history of moonshine production in the Smoky Mountains. $5 samples are offered. The Ole Smoky Moonshine Distillery, "The Holler", is America's most visited distillery. A second distillery, dubbed The Barn, opened in fall 2014 in Pigeon Forge.
Ole Smoky opened a new facility called Mashville next to Yazoo Brewing Company in the heart of Nashville in the spring of 2019.

History
When Tennessee state law changed to allow the distillation of spirits, Ole Smoky Distillery, LLC became the first federally licensed distillery in the history of East Tennessee. The distillery opened the weekend of July 4, 2010. At opening, it was one of only four distilleries operating in the state. Jack Daniel's and George Dickel received their licenses before Prohibition, and Benjamin Prichard's opened their Tennessee facility in 1997.

Products
Currently, Ole Smoky Tennessee Moonshine nationally retails fifteen flavors of moonshine made using authentic East Tennessee recipes, jarred and shipped directly from the company's Gatlinburg distillery. Original Moonshine (100 proof), White Lightnin' (100 proof), Lightnin' Line (80 proof): Strawberry Lightnin', Lemon Drop Lightnin' and Hunch Punch Lightnin',  and the 40 proof line including: Moonshine Cherries, Peach Moonshine, Apple Pie Moonshine, Blackberry Moonshine, Strawberry Moonshine, Lemon Drop Moonshine, Pineapple Moonshine, Watermelon Moonshine, Sweet Tea Moonshine and Charred Moonshine are available selectively in 49 states and Canada. The distillery uses a 100-year-old family recipe, which was perfected with the help of Dave Pickerell, who served as the Master Distiller for Maker's Mark for over 15 years. The ingredients are locally sourced.

Ole Smoky Distillery also produces a peanut butter whiskey that received ten well-known spirits awards in November 2020.

Media reaction
Media coverage of Ole Smoky's opening included a visit by the Today Show and an appearance on Martha Stewart Living Radio. They continue to garner national media coverage in major press and consumer publications.

References

External links 
 
 Gatlinburg Chamber of Commerce listing
 Trip Advisor reviews
 Today Show segment on Ole Smoky 
 Knoxville News Sentinel article on grand opening

Distilleries in Tennessee
American companies established in 2010
Sevier County, Tennessee